Randy Padilla (born 17 March 1991) is a Belizean international footballer who plays for Deportivo Ayutla, as a striker.

Career
Born in Belmopan, Padilla has played club football for Deportivo Ayutla, Deportivo Quiriguá, Belmopan Bandits and Deportivo Quiché.

He made his international debut for Belize in 2018.

References

1991 births
Living people
Belizean footballers
Belize international footballers
Deportivo Ayutla players
Belmopan Bandits players
Association football forwards
Belizean expatriate footballers
Belizean expatriate sportspeople in Guatemala
Expatriate footballers in Guatemala